What's Cooking? may refer to:
 What's Cooking? (film), a 2000 British/American comedy-drama film
 What's Cooking? (British TV series), a British lifestyle show
 What's Cooking? (Australian TV series), an Australian cooking television series

See also
 What's Cooking? with Jamie Oliver, a cooking video game